Vizellopsis is a genus of fungi in the class Dothideomycetes and in the Asterinaceae family. A monotypic genus, it contains the single species Vizellopsis grevilleae.

The relationship of this taxon to other taxa within the class is unknown (incertae sedis).

See also 
 List of Dothideomycetes genera incertae sedis

References

External links 
 Index Fungorum

Dothideomycetes enigmatic taxa
Monotypic Dothideomycetes genera